L. cristata may refer to:

 Lagerstroemia cristata, a species of plant in the genus Lagerstroemia
 Lascoria cristata, a species of moth in the genus Lascoria
 Lasiodora cristata, a species of tarantula in the genus Lasiodora
 Lepiota cristata, a species of mushroom in the genus Lepiota commonly called the stinking dapperling
 Lophostrix cristata, a species of owl in the family Strigidae commonly called the crested owl
 Lophotibis cristata, a species of bird in the ibis subfamily (Threskiornithinae) called the Madagascan ibis